A leader is one who influences or leads others.

Leader may also refer to:

Places

Municipalities
 Leader, Colorado, United States
 Leader, Saskatchewan, Canada

Rivers
 Leader River, New Zealand

Buildings
 Leader House, a building in Sheffield, England

People
 Leader (surname)
 Gary Glitter (born 1944), a musician nicknamed "The Leader"
 Oswald Mosley (1896–1980), a British politician known to his followers as "The Leader"

Art, entertainment, and media

Films
 Leader (1964 film), a Hindi film starring Dilip Kumar
 Leader (2009 film), a Sinhalese film starring Ranjan Ramanayaka
 Leader (2010 film), a Telugu film starring Rana Daggubati

Literature
 The Leader, novel by Guy Walters
 "The Leader" (story), a satirical story by Radoje Domanović
 The Great Leader, book 1 in the Detective Sunderson black-comic detective novel series by Jim Harrison

Music 
Groups, labels, and roles
 Leader (orchestra), a position within an orchestra
 Leader Records (UK), a folk music record label
 Leader Records (US), a subsidiary of Kapp Records
 The Leaders, a musical group

Songs
 "The Leader," a song by The Clash on the album Sandinista!

Newspapers

Current newspapers
 Leader Community Newspapers, a series of 33 local papers in metropolitan Melbourne, Australia
Regina Leader-Post, formerly the Leader, in Regina, Saskatchewan, Canada
 Liverpool Leader, formerly the Leader, a newspaper published in Liverpool, New South Wales, Australia

 The Leader (Angaston), a weekly newspaper published in the Barossa Valley, South Australia
 The Leader (Corning), a daily newspaper published in Corning, New York, United States
 The Leader (Flower Mound), a community newspaper published in Flower Mound, Texas, United States
 The Leader (Fredonia), a newspaper published by the State University of New York at Fredonia
 The Leader (Houston), a newspaper published in Houston, Texas
 The Leader (Utah), a newspaper published by Pioneer Newspapers in Tremonton, Utah, United States
 The Leader (Welsh newspaper), a daily paper in Wales
 The Leader, a nickname for the New Hampshire Union Leader newspaper in New Hampshire, United States
 The Leader, common name for the St George and Sutherland Shire Leader, in Southern Sydney, Australia
 Limerick Leader, in Limerick, Ireland
 The Leinster Leader, a local newspaper in Co. Kildare, Ireland

Former newspapers
 Labour Leader, a British newspaper (1888–1986)
Lincoln County Leader, a weekly newspaper in Oregon, U.S., published 1893–1987
 The Leader (Allahabad newspaper), published 1909–1967
 The Leader (English newspaper), a weekly newspaper (1850–1860) founded by G. H. Lewes
 The Leader (Welsh newspaper), a local daily newspaper in Chester, England, published 1973-2017 (also a still-ongoing website)
 The Leader (Irish newspaper), a defunct Irish newspaper founded in 1900 by D. P. Moran
 The Leader (Melbourne), a weekly newspaper in Melbourne, Australia, companion to The Age, published from 1862 to 1918
 The Leader (Orange, NSW), a defunct Australian newspaper

Other arts, entertainment, and media
 Leader (character), a fictional character from Marvel Comics
 Film leader, a length of film that aids in threading a filmstrip
 Leading article, a piece of writing intended to promote an opinion, also called an editorial
 The Leader (web series), a Chinese web series about Karl Marx

Initiatives and organizations
 Leader (political party), a minor political party in Israel
 LEADER programme, a European Union initiative for rural development

Other uses 
 Front-runner, or leader
 Leader (dance partner)
 Leader (spark), part of an electrical spark
 Leader (typography), a row of characters (usu. dots or dashes) to connect items across a page (as in a table of contents)
 River Leader, river in Scotland
 Leader, in angling, the section of fishing line between the main line and the hook
 Leader, in architecture, a synonym for downspout
 Leader, in distributed computing, the process selected after a leader election
 Leader, an appliance sub-brand of Haier
 SR Leader class, an experimental British steam locomotive
 In engineering drawing, a leader or leader line is a thin line connecting a label or dimension with the part to which it applies

See also
Bandleader
Orchestra leader
Leadership (disambiguation)
Leading (disambiguation)
Lider (disambiguation)
Loss leader
Scout leader
SR Leader class, a class of locomotive
Team leader
:Category:Positions of authority